Pterygospinous process, also known as the Civinini process or processus pterygospinosus, is a sharp spine on the posterior edge of the lateral pterygoid plate of the sphenoid bone. The pterygospinous process is attached pterygospinous ligament which stretches towards the spine of the sphenoid.

References
http://www.mondofacto.com/facts/dictionary?pterygospinous+process

Bones of the head and neck